Israel T. Almy (1892-1963) was an American architect from Fall River, Massachusetts.

Life and career
Almy was born in Middletown, Rhode Island on Christmas Eve of 1892.  In 1913 he took a position as a draftsman with Fall River architect Edward M. Corbett.  He was educated at Northeastern College in Boston from 1919 to 1923, returning to Corbett after his graduation.  He later became Corbett's business partner, and opened his own office soon afterwards, in 1935.  He practiced alone until his death on December 14, 1963.

Mr. Almy's Architecture License number in MA was 4, making him among the first to be registered to practice in Massachusetts.

After his death, the firm became Israel T. Almy Associates, with Almy's son, Thomas B. Almy, as principal.  The firm was later reduced to simply Almy Associates, with offices in Somerset.

Works
 1936 - Somerset High School (Old), 625 County St, Somerset, Massachusetts
 Demolished in 2014
 1937 - Henry F. Anthony School, 51 Middle Rd, Portsmouth, Rhode Island
 1938 - Westport Town Hall, 816 Main St, Westport, Massachusetts
 1939 - Sunset Hill Apartments, Sunset Hill, Fall River, Massachusetts
 In association with Samuel T. Dubitsky
 1948 - Strand Theater (Remodeling), 1363 Pleasant St, Fall River, Massachusetts
 Altered
 1949 - Freetown Elementary School, Bullock Rd, Freetown, Massachusetts
 1950 - Joseph Case High School (Old), Main St, Swansea, Massachusetts
 1951 - Palmer River Elementary School, Winthrop St, Rehoboth, Massachusetts
 1952 - Dighton Elementary School, Somerset Ave, Dighton, Massachusetts
 1953 - Westport Elementary School, 380 Old County Rd, Westport, Massachusetts
 1954 - Sacred Heart R. C. School, Taunton, Massachusetts
 1955 - Henry B. Burkland Junior High School, Mayflower Ave, Middleborough, Massachusetts
 1956 - Hastings Junior High School, 30 School St, Fairhaven, Massachusetts
 1957 - Apponequet Regional High School, Howland Rd, Lakeville, Massachusetts
 1958 - School of Nursing, St. Anne's Hospital, 795 Middle St, Fall River, Massachusetts
 1961 - Portsmouth High School, Education Ln, Portsmouth, Rhode Island
 1963 - Barrington High School (Additions), Lincoln Ave, Barrington, Rhode Island
 1964 - St. Joseph R. C. School, 100 Spring St, Fairhaven, Massachusetts
 1965 - Somerset Police and Fire Station, 465 County St, Somerset, Massachusetts
 1966 - Somerset Junior High School, 1141 Brayton Ave, Somerset, Massachusetts
 1967 - Thomas Chew Memorial, 803 Bedford St, Fall River, Massachusetts

References

1892 births
1963 deaths
Architects from Massachusetts
Architects from Rhode Island
People from Fall River, Massachusetts
Northeastern University alumni
People from Middletown, Rhode Island
People from Somerset, Massachusetts